Viscount  was the fourth daimyō of the tozama feudal domain of Tendō, in Dewa Province, northern Japan. Oda Suemaru was a direct descendant of Oda Nobunaga, through Nobunaga's son Oda Nobukatsu.

Biography
Suemaru was born as the sixth son of Oda Nobumichi (the 2nd Lord Tendō).  He was still in an infant when his brother, Oda Nobutoshi (the 3rd Lord Tendō) was placed under house arrest and ordered to retire due to his involvement in the Ōuetsu Reppan Dōmei of northern domains against the Meiji government during the Boshin War of the Meiji Restoration in December 1868. Nobutoshi was allowed to return to Tendō in July 1869. However, in the interim, the title of daimyō had been replaced with "domain governor" by the new government. Soon after Nobutoshi's return to Tendō, he replaced Suemaru as governor and final lord of Tendō.

Suemaru died at the age of six, and his grave is at the Buddhist temple of Korin-ji in Bunkyō, Tokyo.

|-

|-

1866 births
1871 deaths
Samurai
Daimyo
Oda clan